Lior Miller (born 13 February 1972) is an Israeli film and television actor, DJ, and model.

Career
He was first discovered after appearing in a commercial for Castro clothing.

Miller later acted in the television series Ramat Aviv Gimel. He has also appeared on the Israeli version of the television series Dancing with the Stars.

Notes

External links

1972 births
Israeli male film actors
Israeli male television actors
Living people